Tú, solo tú (You, Only You) is a 1950 Mexican film. It was written by Janet Alcoriza and Luis Alcoriza.

Cast
 Rosita Quintana		
 Luis Aguilar		
 Luis Alcoriza		
 Arturo Soto Rangel		
 Dolores Camarillo		
 Rina Valdarno		
 Freddie Romero		
 Roberto Y. Palacios		
 Eufrosina García	 ...	(as La Flaca)
 José Escanero		
 José Chávez		
 Ricardo Adalid		
 José Pardavé		
 Pascual García Peña		
 Edmundo Espino

External links
 

1950 films
1950s Spanish-language films
Mexican musical comedy films
1950 musical comedy films
Mexican black-and-white films
Films directed by Miguel M. Delgado
1950s Mexican films